The Regional Comprehensive Economic Partnership (RCEP  ) is a free trade agreement among the Asia-Pacific nations of Australia, Brunei, Cambodia, China, Indonesia, Japan, South Korea, Laos, Malaysia, Myanmar, New Zealand, the Philippines, Singapore, Thailand, and Vietnam. The 15 member countries account for about 30% of the world's population (2.2 billion people) and 30% of global GDP ($29.7 trillion), making it the largest trade bloc in history. Signed in November 2020, RCEP is the first free trade agreement among the largest economies in Asia, including China, Indonesia, Japan, and South Korea.

The RCEP was conceived at the 2011 ASEAN Summit in Bali, Indonesia, while negotiations formally launched during the 2012 ASEAN Summit in Cambodia. India, which took part in the initial negotiations but later decided to opt out, was invited to join the bloc at any time. Any other country or separate customs territory in the region can accede to the pact from 1 July 2023 onward. The treaty was formally signed on 15 November 2020 at the virtual ASEAN Summit hosted by Vietnam. For the first ten ratifying countries, the trade pact took effect on 1 January 2022.

The RCEP includes a mix of high-, middle-, and low-income countries. It is expected to eliminate about 90% of the tariffs on imports between its signatories within 20 years of coming into force, and establish common rules for e-commerce, trade, and intellectual property. Several analysts predicted that it would offer significant economic gains for signatory nations, boost post-pandemic economic recovery, as well as "pull the economic centre of gravity back towards Asia, with China poised to take the lead in writing trade rules for the region," leaving the United States behind in economic and political affairs in the region. Reactions from others were neutral or negative, with some analysts saying that the economic gains from the trade deal would be modest. The RCEP was criticized by the Australian Institute of International Affairs, stating that it ignores labor, human rights, and environmental sustainability issues.

Membership

Signatories
 All ten members of ASEAN (excludes candidate member ):
 
 
 
 
 
 
 
 
 
 
 The three East Asian members of ASEAN Plus Three:
 
 
 
 The two Oceanian members of ASEAN Plus Six:

Ratifications

Applicants  
The trade agreement is open for new members 18 months after the partnership came into force. 
 and  have applied for accession into the partnership.

Contents

The agreement is intended to reduce tariffs and red tape. It includes unified rules of origin throughout the bloc, which may facilitate international supply chains and trade within the region. It also prohibits certain tariffs. It does not focus on labor unions, environmental protection, or government subsidies.

The RCEP is not as comprehensive as the Comprehensive and Progressive Agreement for Trans-Pacific Partnership, another free trade agreement in the region that includes some of the same countries.
The RCEP "does not establish unified standards on labour and the environment, or commit countries to open services and other vulnerable areas of their economies."

The tariffs schedule just for Japan is 1,334 pages long.

Projected value

The combined GDP of potential RCEP members surpassed the combined GDP of Trans-Pacific Partnership (TPP) members in 2007. It was suggested that continued economic growth, particularly in China and Indonesia, could see total GDP in the original RCEP membership grow to over US$100 trillion by 2050, roughly double the project size of TPP economies. On 23 January 2017, President Donald Trump signed a memorandum withdrawing the United States from the TPP, a move which was seen to improve the chances of success for RCEP.

According to a 2020 projection, the agreement is expected to enlarge the global economy by US$186 billion. According to Peter Petri and Michael Plummer of the Brookings Institution, the RCEP could add $209 billion annually to world incomes, and $500 billion to world trade by 2030, and that "new agreements will make the economies of North and Southeast Asia more efficient, linking their strengths in technology, manufacturing, agriculture, and natural resources." According to computer simulations in a related paper also by Petri and Plummer published by the Peterson Institute for International Economics (PIIE), the RCEP will raise global national incomes in 2030 by an annual $147 billion and $186 billion respectively, "yield especially large benefits for China, Japan, and South Korea and losses for the United States and India, and "will be especially valuable because it strengthens East Asian interdependence, raising trade among members by $428 billion and reducing trade among nonmembers by $48 billion".

The simulations in Petri and Plummer's PIIE paper showed that the RCEP and the Comprehensive and Progressive Agreement for Trans-Pacific Partnership (CPTPP) would together more than offset the global negative economic impact of the China-United States trade war, but not the individual losses of China and the United States. Moreover, the incremental value of the CPTPP will be reduced by the trade war (from $147 billion to $121 billion) while the value of RCEP will be increased (from $186 billion to $209 billion). The PIIE working paper also stated that "RCEP will be economically significant with or without India, and indeed more significant than the CPTPP, with especially important benefits for China, Japan, and Korea" and that "RCEP will reorient trade and economic ties away from global linkages toward regionally focused relationships in East Asia."

According to the Asian Development Bank (ADB), the RCEP is "relatively comprehensive in coverage" and combines existing deals, which brings Asia a step closer to a region-wide trading bloc. The agreement further liberalizes goods and services trade, establishes common rules of origin for all goods traded, establishes commitments regarding government procurement, and aims to establish open and competitive markets. Though the degree of liberalization within RCEP is not as deep as in the CPTPP, RCEP members are projected to gain $174 billion in real income by 2030, equivalent to 0.4% of the members' aggregate GDP. China, Korea and Japan will benefit the most, with likely gains of $85 billion for China, $48 billion for Japan, and $23 billion for Korea. Other significant RCEP gains will accrue to Indonesia, Malaysia, Thailand, and Vietnam. Due to their RCEP membership, Japan and Korea would accrue gains amounting to 1% of their GDP while Malaysia, Thailand, Vietnam and Brunei would all accrue gains of 0.5% of GDP or higher.

New Zealand's Ministry of Foreign Affairs and Trade stated that the RCEP is projected to add $186 billion to the world economy and increase New Zealand's GDP by around $2.0 billion. The RCEP members took 56% of New Zealand's total exports, representing 61% of New Zealand's goods exports (worth $36.6 billion) and 45% of New Zealand's services exports (worth $11.8 billion). According to the ministry, "RCEP delivers improved market access for New Zealand services exporters and investors in some RCEP markets that go beyond existing FTAs. Under RCEP, New Zealand services exporters and investors will, for the first time, benefit from market access commitments from China and ASEAN countries that are not party to the CPTPP". Following the signing of the RCEP, New Zealand and China signed a deal to further expand their existing free-trade agreement. The expanded deal provides for tariffs to be either removed or cut on many of New Zealand's mostly commodities-based exports, ranging from dairy to timber and seafood, while compliance costs will also be reduced. The deal also opens up sectors such as aviation, education and finance.

History

2011
 August 2011, East Asia Summit Economic Ministers welcomed a Chinese and Japanese joint 'Initiative on Speeding up the Establishment of EAFTA and CEPEA'.
 During the 19th ASEAN Summit held 14–19 November 2011 in Bali, Indonesia, the Regional Comprehensive Economic Partnership (RCEP) was introduced.

2012
 The 44th ASEAN Economic Ministers (AEM) Meeting and Related Meetings were held in Siem Reap, Cambodia, 25 August – 1 September 2012.
 Leaders at the 21st ASEAN Summit held 18–20 November 2012 in Phnom Penh, Cambodia endorsed the framework of RCEP and announced the launch of their negotiations.

2013
The first round of RCEP negotiation was held on 9–13 May 2013 in Brunei.
 The second round of RCEP negotiation was held on 23–27 September 2013 in Brisbane, Australia.

2014
 The third round of RCEP negotiation was held on 20–24 January 2014 in Kuala Lumpur, Malaysia.
The fourth round of RCEP negotiation was held on 31 March – 4 April 2014 in Nanning, China.
The fifth round of RCEP negotiation was held on 21–27 June 2014 in Singapore.
The sixth round of RCEP negotiation and related meetings was held on 1–5 December 2014 in New Delhi, India.

2015
The seventh round of RCEP negotiation was held on 9–13 February 2015 in Bangkok, Thailand. An expert group on electronic commerce met during this round. The Asian Trade Centre (based in Singapore) submitted a proposal regarding an e-Commerce chapter and gave a presentation on the paper.
The eighth round of RCEP negotiation was held on 5–13 June 2015 in Kyoto, Japan.
The ninth round of RCEP negotiation was held on 3–7 August 2015 in Nay Pyi Taw, Myanmar.
The tenth round of RCEP negotiation was held on 12–16 October 2015 in Busan, South Korea. The meetings took place at BEXCO (Busan's Convention and Exhibition Centre). This round included the first region wide stakeholder meeting (organized by the Singapore-based Asian Trade Centre) which involved an informal meeting between government officials and business representatives over lunch followed by an afternoon seminar focused on what RCEP can do to help business operate in the e-Commerce space.

2016
The eleventh round of RCEP negotiation was held on 14–19 February 2016 in Bandar Seri Begawan, Brunei.
The twelfth round of negotiation of RCEP was held on 17–29 April 2016 in Perth, Australia.
The thirteenth round of RCEP negotiation was held on 12–18 June 2016 in Auckland, New Zealand.
The fourteenth round of RCEP negotiation was held on 15–18 August 2016 in Vietnam.
The fifteenth round of RCEP negotiation was held on 11–22 October 2016 in Tianjin, China.
The sixteenth round of negotiations of RCEP was held on 6–10 December 2016 in Tangerang, Indonesia.

2017
The seventeenth round of negotiations of RCEP was held on 27 February – 3 March 2017 in Kobe, Japan.
The eighteenth round of RCEP negotiation was held on 8–12 May 2017 in Manila, Philippines.
The nineteenth round of RCEP negotiation was held on 24–28 July 2017 in Hyderabad, India.
The twentieth round of RCEP negotiation was held on 17–28 October 2017 in Incheon, Korea.
The first RCEP summit was held on 14 November 2017 in Manila, Philippines.

2018
The twenty-first round of RCEP negotiation was held on 2–9 February 2018 in Yogyakarta, Indonesia.
The twenty-second round of RCEP negotiation was held on 28 April – 8 May 2018 in Singapore.
The twenty-third round of RCEP negotiation was held on 17–27 July 2018 in Bangkok, Thailand.
August–October 2018, a series of ministerial meeting in Singapore and Auckland.
The twenty-fourth round of RCEP negotiation was held on 18–27 October 2018 in Auckland, New Zealand.
14 November 2018, a leaders' summit in Singapore was scheduled.

2019
The twenty-fifth round of RCEP negotiations was held from 19 to 28 February in Bali, Indonesia.
2 March 2019, a ministerial meeting of RCEP trade ministers held in Cambodia. The ministers agreed to intensify engagement for the remainder of the year (including by convening more inter-sessional meetings).
Senior officials held inter-sessional meetings starting 24 May 2019 in Bangkok, Thailand to iron out issues pertaining to the goods and services sector.
The twenty-sixth round of RCEP negotiations was held on 3 July 2019 in Melbourne, Australia.
The twenty-seventh round of RCEP negotiations was held in Zhengzhou, China from 22 to 31 July 2019.
 2–3 August 2019, a ministerial meeting of RCEP trade ministers was held in Beijing, China.
3rd RCEP summit was held once again on 31 October – 3 November 2019 in Thailand with 35th ASEAN summit on same day.
The twenty-eighth round of RCEP negotiations was held in Danang, Vietnam from 19 to 27 September 2019.
India opts out of RCEP on 4 November 2019 in ASEAN+3 summit, citing, according to its view, the adverse impact the deal would have on its citizens. In light of India's departure, Japan and China called on India to rejoin the partnership.

2020
The twenty-ninth round of RCEP negotiations was held from 20 to 24 April 2020 as a video conference, due to the current situation regarding COVID-19.
On 30 April 2020, Joint Statement of the 29th RCEP Trade Committee (RCEP TNC) Meeting was issued.
The thirtieth round of RCEP negotiations was held from 15 to 20 May 2020 as a video conference, due to the current situation regarding COVID-19 disease.
The tenth RCEP Inter-sessional Ministerial Meeting held in the form of a video conference on 23 June 2020. The officials reiterated their determination to sign the RCEP at the fourth RCEP Summit in November.
The thirty-first round of RCEP negotiation was held on 9 July 2020 as a video conference, due to the current situation regarding COVID-19 disease.
The Eighth Regional Comprehensive Economic Partnership (RCEP) Ministerial Meeting was held on 27 August 2020 as a video conference, due to the current situation regarding COVID-19 disease. The Ministers issued a Joint Media Statement welcoming the progress made towards finalising the Agreement for signature.
The Eleventh RCEP Inter-sessional Ministerial Meeting held in the form of a video conference on 14 October 2020.
Preparatory RCEP Ministerial Meeting held in the form of a video conference on 11 November 2020.
The RCEP was signed on 15 November 2020, in an unusual ceremony that saw the 15 member countries participate by video link due to the COVID-19 pandemic.

2021
On 9 April 2021, Singapore ratified RCEP agreement and deposited its instrument of ratification with the Secretary-General of ASEAN. Singapore is the first RCEP Participating Country (RPC) to complete the official ratification process.
On 15 April 2021, China deposited the instrument of ratification with the ASEAN secretary-general, marking the completion of the ratification process for the Regional Comprehensive Economic Partnership (RCEP) Agreement.
On 25 June 2021, Japan deposited the instrument of acceptance of the Regional Comprehensive Economic Partnership Agreement with the depositary, the Secretary-General of ASEAN.
On 11 October 2021, Brunei Darussalam ratified the Regional Comprehensive Economic Partnership (RCEP) agreement upon depositing its instrument of ratification with the Secretary-General of ASEAN.
On 15 October 2021, Cambodia ratified the Regional Comprehensive Economic Partnership (RCEP) agreement upon depositing its instrument of ratification with the Secretary-General of ASEAN.
On 28 October 2021, the Permanent Mission of Thailand to ASEAN deposited the Instrument of Ratification of the Regional Comprehensive Economic Partnership (RCEP) Agreement with the Secretary-General of ASEAN.
On 29 October 2021, Vietnam ratified the Regional Comprehensive Economic Partnership (RCEP) agreement upon depositing its instrument of ratification with the Secretary-General of ASEAN.
On 2 November 2021, Australia and New Zealand deposited the instruments of ratification with the Secretary-General of ASEAN.
On 3 December 2021, Republic of Korea ratified the Regional Comprehensive Economic Partnership (RCEP) agreement upon depositing its instrument of ratification with the Secretary-General of ASEAN.

2022
On 1 January 2022, the Regional Comprehensive Economic Partnership (RCEP) agreement took effect for the first ten ratifying countries.
On 17 January 2022, Malaysia ratified the Regional Comprehensive Economic Partnership (RCEP) agreement upon depositing its instrument of ratification with the Secretary-General of ASEAN.
On 1 February 2022, the Regional Comprehensive Economic Partnership (RCEP) agreement took effect for Republic of Korea.
On 21 February 2022, Brian Lo, the Director General of Trade and Industry said that Hong Kong has submitted an application to join Regional Comprehensive Economic Partnership agreement.
On 18 March 2022, the Regional Comprehensive Economic Partnership (RCEP) agreement took effect for Malaysia.
On 1 May 2022, the Regional Comprehensive Economic Partnership (RCEP) agreement took effect between China and Myanmar.
On 3 November  2022, Indonesia ratified the Regional Comprehensive Economic Partnership (RCEP) agreement upon depositing its instrument of ratification with the Secretary-General of ASEAN.

2023
On 2 January 2023, the Regional Comprehensive Economic Partnership (RCEP) agreement took effect for Indonesia.
On 21 February 2023, Philippines ratified the Regional Comprehensive Economic Partnership (RCEP) agreement upon depositing its instrument of ratification with the Secretary-General of ASEAN.

Reactions

Positive 
When the RCEP was signed, Chinese premier Li Keqiang declared it "a victory of multilateralism and free trade". Singaporean prime minister Lee Hsien Loong called it "a major step forward for our region" and a sign of support for free trade and economic interdependence.

Several analysts predicted that it would help stimulate the economies of signatory nations amid the COVID-19 pandemic, as well as "pull the economic centre of gravity back towards Asia, with China poised to take the lead in writing trade rules for the region", leaving the U.S. behind in economic and political affairs.

Mohamed Azmin Ali, Minister of International Trade and Industry of Malaysia, said the RCEP would encourage local businesses to enter global markets and would increase Malaysia's exports. He stated that RCEP signatories would enjoy preferential treatment due to the removal of tariff and non-tariff trade barriers.

Joko Widodo, President of Indonesia, stated that the signing of the RCEP was a historic day that signaled Indonesia's strong commitment to multilateralism. Agus Suparmanto, Indonesian Minister of Trade, said that the RCEP could boost Indonesia's exports to signatory nations by 8-11% and boost investment into Indonesia by 18-22%, and expressed confidence that the trade pact would benefit Indonesian business.

Moon Jae-in, the President of South Korea, praised the RCEP as an unprecedented mega regional trading agreement and expressed confidence that it will "contribute to the recovery of multilateralism and the development of free trade around the world, beyond the region". Moon also stated that he expects the RCEP to open the world's biggest e-commerce market. The Korean Chamber of Commerce and Industry welcomed the conclusion of the RCEP, expecting that it would "expand a new free trade bloc and serve as the basis for revitalizing the Asia-Pacific regional economic markets". The RCEP will benefit Korean companies by removing tariffs on several Korean imports in signatory nations, especially in steel, automobiles and electronics.

Kishore Mahbubani, Singapore's former permanent representative to the United Nations and former President of the United Nations Security Council, stated that the "future of Asia will be written in four letters, RCEP" and that India did a major geopolitical favor to China by withdrawing from the RCEP, just as the United States did by withdrawing from the CPTPP. Mahbubani added that with India and the United States absent, "a massive economic ecosystem centered on China is evolving in the region".

According to Peter Petri and Michael Plummer at the Brookings Institution, the agreement represented "a triumph of ASEAN's middle-power diplomacy" and would lead to significant increases in world incomes and trade by 2030, even though it "says nothing at all about labor, the environment, or state-owned enterprises". They added, "However, ASEAN-centered trade agreements tend to improve over time."

Criticism 
In 2016, the Electronic Frontier Foundation described the first draft of RCEP's intellectual property provisions as containing "quite simply the worst provisions on copyright ever seen in a trade agreement."

India pulled out of the deal in November 2019, primarily due to concerns of dumping of manufactured goods from China and agricultural and dairy products from Australia and New Zealand, potentially affecting its own domestic industrial and farming sectors. Due to India's withdrawal, there are concerns that China may dominate RCEP. ASEAN leaders stated that India was welcome to return and join the bloc. Any other state may join RCEP 18 months after it comes into force.

The Wall Street Journal reported in November 2019 that the tariff-related liberalizations from RCEP would be modest, calling it a "paper tiger". A comprehensive study into the deal shows that it would add just 0.08% to China's 2030 GDP without India's participation.

Human rights groups said RCEP could negatively affect small farmers, lead to more land conflicts, and make workers in poorer nations worse off. Rashmi Banga, a senior economist at UNCTAD, said that implementing RCEP at a time of crisis will make poorer nations in Southeast Asia even more vulnerable, adding, "Most Asean nations will see rising imports and declining exports. That will worsen their balance of trade and weaken their fiscal position."

Former Australian prime minister Malcolm Turnbull said that despite the "hoopla", the RCEP was "a really low-ambition trade deal that we shouldn't kid ourselves on", adding, "It's a very old fashioned trade deal. It's low ambition. It's been affected largely for strategic reasons."

CNBC reported that the economic benefits from RCEP would be modest and could take years to materialize, with analysts from Citi suggesting that RCEP was "a coup for China" non-economically. The Citi report also said that India is one of the biggest losers from RCEP, adding, "exclusion will likely make India less attractive as an alternative production base versus ASEAN."

Indian external affairs minister Subrahmanyam Jaishankar said it is not in India's interest to join the RCEP, as the trade deal would have "fairly immediate negative consequences" for India's economy. Zia Haq, associate editor at Hindustan Times, said India has "rightly shunned" the RCEP because at the moment it cannot take advantage of free-trade agreements. He went on to say, "India fears the RCEP will also limit its policy-making room in areas such as foreign investment." He said that according to some analysts, there will be limited gains from the RCEP without India, which is Asia's third-largest economy.

Yen Huai-shing, deputy director at the Chung-Hua Institution for Economic Research, wrote on Taipei Times that the RCEP is "not to have a strong impact" on Taiwan. She said that most observers did not expect the RCEP to provide a high degree of openness, and that it provides no dispute settlement mechanism when handling certain trade issues such as meat inspection regulations, adding, "In other words, they are more symbolic than binding."

According to Patricia Ranald at the Australian Institute of International Affairs, RCEP has limited gains from trade and ignores labor, human rights, and environmental sustainability issues. She said, "Despite claims about the benefits of common standards, the RCEP has no commitments to internationally recognised labour rights and environmental standards which Australia and other RCEP governments have endorsed through the United Nations and the International Labour Organization."

Salvatore Babones commented on Foreign Policy that, by 2030, the world's economy would be expected to grow around 40% and the RCEP may add 0.2% to it, the scale of a "rounding error". He said that some main exports to China, such as Japan's machinery and Australia's iron ore, are already tariff-free. Babones said that with the signing of RCEP, "China may score propaganda points by posing as the guardian of the international system, but the system itself is increasingly bypassing China."

Some analysts and economists said the RCEP is unlikely to benefit its developing member countries in the short term. Kate Lappin, Asia Pacific regional secretary at Public Services International, said that the pact has no provisions for improving labor rights, adding, "The agreement might not be good for governments and workers, but still deliver profits for foreign investors."

See also
 Comprehensive Economic Partnership for East Asia (CEPEA)
 Comprehensive and Progressive Agreement for Trans-Pacific Partnership (CPTPP)
 Asian values
 East Asian Community
 East Asia Summit
 Free-trade area
 Free Trade Area of the Asia-Pacific (FTAAP)
 Market access
 Pan-Asianism
 South Asian Free Trade Area
 Trans-Pacific Partnership
 Indo-Pacific Economic Framework (IPEF)

Notes

References

External links
 

Asia-Pacific
ASEAN
Economy of Asia
East Asia
Southeast Asia
Free trade agreements of Australia
Free trade agreements of China
Free trade agreements of Indonesia
Free trade agreements of Japan
Free trade agreements of Malaysia
Free trade agreements of New Zealand
Free trade agreements of the Philippines
Free trade agreements of Singapore
Free trade agreements of South Korea
Free trade agreements of Thailand
Free trade agreements of Vietnam
Free-trade areas
Supranational unions
Trade blocs
Treaties concluded in 2020
Treaties entered into force in 2022